BH Radio 1 is a Bosnian national public mainstream radio channel operated by Radio and Television of Bosnia and Herzegovina (BHRT). The program is broadcast on a daily basis 24 hours with equal use one of the three official languages in Bosnia and Herzegovina (Bosnian, Croatian or Serbian). This radio station broadcasts a variety of programs such as news, music, talk shows, radio-drama, sports, mosaic and children's programs. 
BH Radio 1 is one of three organizational units in BHRT (together with BHT 1 - national public television service and music production.

See also 
 List of radio stations in Bosnia and Herzegovina
 MP BHRT
 BHT 1

External links 
 

Communications in Bosnia and Herzegovina
Multilingual broadcasters
Publicly funded broadcasters
Radio stations established in 1945
1945 establishments in Yugoslavia
Radio and Television of Bosnia and Herzegovina